Andy Bisek (born August 18, 1986) is an American Greco-Roman wrestler. Bisek is of Polish descent. He was a 2016 Olympian and two-time World bronze medalist in Greco-Roman wrestling, representing Team USA.

High school and college
At Chaska High School in Minnesota, Bisek finished third in the state. Originally he planned to attend Minnesota State University, Mankato but after a meeting with Chas Betts, he decided to attend Northern Michigan University from which he graduated.

International
Bisek competed at the 2011 World Wrestling Championships and the 2013 World Wrestling Championships, but did not place at either event. At the Golden Grand Prix Ivan Poddubny 2013 in the quarterfinals was eliminated by Roman Vlasov of Russia.

At the 2014 World Wrestling Championships, Bisek was a bronze medalist at Greco-Roman 75 kg weight division. He would knock off defending Olympic champion from 2012, Roman Vlasov of Russia, on the way to his first World level bronze medal. It would also be the first World Greco-Roman medal for the United States since 2009. Bisek also competed at the 2014 FILA Wrestling World Cup.

In 2015, Bisek again wrestled at the World Wrestling Championships, where he earned a second Bronze medal. Bisek earned his spot on the United States Greco-Roman wrestling team at 75 kg for the 2016 Summer Olympics, where he reached the quarter finals, finishing 1-1 at the event.

References

1986 births
American male sport wrestlers
Living people
World Wrestling Championships medalists
Pan American Games gold medalists for the United States
Wrestlers at the 2016 Summer Olympics
Olympic wrestlers of the United States
Pan American Games medalists in wrestling
Wrestlers at the 2015 Pan American Games
People from Waconia, Minnesota
Medalists at the 2015 Pan American Games
20th-century American people
21st-century American people